

The Whitney Museum of American Art original building is a collection of three 1838 rowhouses located at 8–12 West 8th Street between Fifth Avenue and MacDougal Street in the Greenwich Village neighborhood of Manhattan, New York City. In 1907, Gertrude Vanderbilt Whitney established the Whitney Studio Gallery at 8 West 8th Street adjacent to her own MacDougal Alley studio. This, and the later Whitney Studio Club at 147 West 4th Street, were intended to provide young artists with places to meet and exhibit their works.

In 1918, American artist and friend Robert Winthrop Chanler was commissioned to redesign the interior of the 8th Street property, adding an allegorical bas-relief ceiling, a 20-foot-high plaster and bronze fireplace, elaborate stained glass windows, and decorative screens.

In 1929, when the Metropolitan Museum of Art rejected Whitney's offer of the gift of nearly 500 new artworks that she had collected, Whitney established the Whitney Museum of American Art. In 1931, she had architect Auguste L. Noel of the firm of Noel & Miller convert the three row houses at 8–12 West 8th Street into a gallery and residence for herself, and the museum's first home.

In the 1940s,  plans to incorporate the collections of the Whitney into the Metropolitan Museum of Art as part of the 75th-anniversary celebration of the Met were unrealized. In 1954, the museum moved uptown to new quarters on 54th Street between 5th and 6th Avenues – eventually settling in 1966 at 945 Madison Avenue at East 75th Street – and the building, with the addition of #14 West 8th Street, an Italianate house built in 1853–54, became the New York Studio School of Drawing, Painting and Sculpture.

The building is located within the Greenwich Village Historic District, established in 1969 by the New York City Landmarks Preservation Commission, and was declared a National Historic Landmark in 1992. Listed on the World Monuments Fund's 2012 Watch list, it has been the focus of an extensive restoration project on the part of the University of Pennsylvania's Architectural Conservation Laboratory, in collaboration with the fund.

Gallery 
These photographs, from a 1937 museum publication, show the museum as it was at the time:

See also 
 National Register of Historic Places listings in New York County, New York

References

External links 

 Places Where Women Made History: New York Studio School of Drawing, Painting and Sculpture, at National Park Service

National Historic Landmarks in Manhattan
School buildings on the National Register of Historic Places in Manhattan
Houses completed in 1838
Greenwich Village
Whitney Museum of American Art
Neoclassical architecture in New York (state)
1838 establishments in New York (state)